Kékestető TV Tower is a  tall multifunctional transmitter built of reinforced concrete on the  high Kékes mountain, Hungary. It is also an observation tower, including a restaurant.

History 
The first 20.4-metre high observation tower was built in 1889 and demolished in 1938. The present-day TV tower was built in 1981.

Transmitted channels

Radio stations

Television channels

References 

Radio masts and towers in Hungary
Towers in Hungary
Towers completed in 1981
Observation towers
Restaurant towers
1981 establishments in Hungary
Buildings and structures in Heves County